NGC 223 is a spiral galaxy located approximately 238 million light-years from Earth. It is located in the constellation Cetus. It was discovered on January 5, 1853, by George Bond.

See also 
 List of NGC objects (1–1000)

References

External links 
 
 
 SEDS

0223
0450
+00-02-129
2527
Spiral galaxies
Cetus (constellation)
Astronomical objects discovered in 1853